Scd1 can refer to:
 Stearoyl-CoA desaturase-1, an enzyme involved in fatty acid metabolism
 , SCSI audio-oriented optical disk drives